Harry Frederick Dietz (8 December 1890, Indianapolis -4 September 1954, Kennett Square PA) was an American economic entomologist.

He wrote:-
with Morrison, H. The Coccidae or Scale Insects of Indiana, Eighth Ann. Rep. Indiana State Ent., April, pp. 250–258 (1916).
with Thomas Elliot Snyder Biological Notes on the Termites of the Canal Zone and Adjoining Parts of the Republic of Panama, Journal of Agriculture (1923)
with J. Zetek The blackfly of citrus and other subtropical plants. USDA Bulletin 885: 1-55 (1924).
with Thomas Elliot Snyder  Biological notes on the Canal Zone and adjoining parts of the Republic of Panama. Journal of Agriculture 26(7): 279-302 9 (1924).

References
Osborn, H. 1937 Fragments of Entomological History Including Some Personal Recollections of Men and Events. Columbus, Ohio, Published by the Author 1 1-394.

External links
 

1890 births
1954 deaths
American entomologists
20th-century American zoologists